Yael Eckstein  is president and CEO of the International Fellowship of Christians and Jews (also referred to as IFCJ or The Fellowship).

Biography
Eckstein is the daughter of the late Rabbi Yechiel Eckstein. She was born in Evanston, Illinois, and raised in Chicago. Eckstein studied at Torat Chesed Seminary in Israel, Queens College in New York, and Hebrew University in Jerusalem. She has degrees in biblical studies and Jewish and sociology studies.

Eckstein made aliyah in 2005 with her husband, who is Israeli. After the initial move, Eckstein lived with her father Yeckiel, during which she saw the workings of the Fellowship. After 15 years of working under her father's guidance, where Yael's first job at The Fellowship was stamping envelopes, Rabbi Eckstein began preparing her for a succession role as IFCJ's next CEO. In 2006, she started writing to Fellowship donors about her experiences during the Second Lebanon War.

Today, she regularly blogs and writes op-eds for The Times of Israel and The Jerusalem Post. She has also spoken at international events, including a Briefing and Panel Discussion on Religious Persecution in the Middle East in Washington, D.C. She also shares her perspective on Judaism, life in the Holy Land, and her work with The Fellowship on The Fellowship’s radio program called Holy Land Moments. And she hosts the Nourish Your Biblical Roots and Conversations with Yael podcasts. Yael lives now in Israel with her husband and four children.

The Fellowship
Eckstein previously held the positions of global executive vice president, senior vice president and director of program development and ministry outreach.
 
In 2016, Yechiel Eckstein publicly blessed Yael as the one he envisioned running IFCJ in the future. In 2017, the Fellowship board (excluding her father, according to Yael) designated her as president-elect.
 
In 2019, after the death of her father at the age of 67, she became president and CEO of The Fellowship, the Chicago-based nonprofit with the office in Israel. She is also responsible for overseeing all Fellowship programs as The Fellowship’s President and CEO and is the organization’s international spokesperson.

In 2023, leaked files from the reputation management firm Eliminalia showed that the firm had been engaged to target stories about Eckstein and her father, specifically trying to remove content reporting their combined $4 million annual compensation in 2019, which an IFCJ spokesperson said was due to a death benefit paid out to Rabbi Eckstein's widow, and that Eliminalia had used what the Washington Post characterized as "bogus copyright complaints" in its attempts to do so.

Awards
In 2014, Yael Eckstein was named "One of Israel's 100 Most Influential Women" by Makor Rishon. In 2015, she was featured on the cover of Nashim (Women) magazine. In 2019, she was recognized by the Algemeiner Journal as one of the Top 100 People Positively Influencing Jewish Life. In both 2020 and 2021, Eckstein was named one of The Jerusalem Post’s 50 Most Influential Jews.

Books
Holy Land Reflections (2012)
Spiritual Cooking with Yael (2014)
Generation to Generation (2020)

References

External links 

 

 

Christian and Jewish interfaith dialogue
Hebrew University of Jerusalem alumni
Jewish American writers
Living people
People from Chicago
Queens College, City University of New York alumni
Year of birth missing (living people)
21st-century American Jews